Kyaikto is a town in the Mon State of south-east Myanmar. It is part of the Kyaikto Township in Thaton District. It is the nearest town to the Kyaiktiyo Pagoda (or the Golden Rock), a famous landmark in Myanmar.

External links

Satellite map at Maplandia.com

Township capitals of Myanmar
Populated places in Mon State